Goldrood House is a Grade II listed building in Chantry, Ipswich, Suffolk, England. The building is currently part of St Joseph's College.

The building was built in 1809 and bought by for Samuel Alexander in 1811. It is a two-storey white brick house. It has a large 3 windowed bow on the south eastern front. It was the home of the Quaker banker Dykes Alexander.

The Goldrood Book
The Goldrood Book is an album of Mary Ann Alexander which contains photographic copies of paintings of Goldrood House.

References

Buildings and structures in Ipswich
Grade II listed houses in Suffolk